Preschool education is the provision of structured learning to children before the commencement of formal education.

Preschool may also refer to:
"Pre-School" (South Park), an episode of the animated television series South Park
Preschool (album), a 1997 compilation album by Gang Green

See also